Algal nutrient solutions are made up of a mixture of chemical salts and water.  Sometimes referred to as "Growth Media", nutrient solutions (along with carbon dioxide and light), provide the materials needed for algae to grow.  Nutrient solutions (e.g., Hoagland solution), as opposed to fertilizers, are designed specifically for use in aquatic environments and their composition is much more precise.

See also 
List of algal culture collections
Algaculture
Algal fuel
Aquatic Species Program
Hydroponics
Seri microalgae culture collection
Chu 13, an algal growth medium

External links 
University of Texas growth media recipes.
University of Cologne growth media recipes
 Culture Media Recipes and Culture Medium Kits (CCMP, Bigelow Laboratory for Ocean Sciences)

Algaculture
High lipid content microalgae